Route 28 may refer to:

Any road on the List of highways numbered 28

Baltimore
The following surface routes in the Baltimore Metropolitan Area have been numbered 28:
Gwynn Oak Park Line, 1908 to 1910
Bedford Square Line, 1924
Lakeside Line, 1924 to 1929
Route 28 (Baltimore 1947-2001), Liberty Heights Avenue and Russell Street